The oboe da caccia (literally "hunting oboe" in Italian), also sometimes referred to as an oboe da silva, is a double reed woodwind instrument in the oboe family, pitched a fifth below the oboe and used primarily in the Baroque period of European classical music. It has a curved tube, and in the case of instruments by Eichentopf (and modern copies of same), a brass bell, unusual for an oboe.

Its range is close to that of the cor anglais—that is, from the F below middle C (notated C4 but sounding F3) to the D above the treble staff (notated D6 but sounding G5). The oboe da caccia is thus a transposing instrument in F.  The notated range is identical to that of the soprano baroque oboe, and with a good reed, all registers speak very easily. Johann Sebastian Bach tended to favor the middle and lowest registers, however, perhaps because they are the most characteristic ones for this instrument.

Development

The instrument was likely invented by J.H. Eichentopf of Leipzig, Germany.  The first dated reference to the oboe da caccia is 1722, when composer Johann Friedrich Fasch ordered "Waldhautbois" from Leipzig for the court at Zerbst. The first recorded use of the instrument is on 24 June 1723, when the Bach aria BWV 167/3, "Gottes Wort, das trüget nicht", from the cantata Ihr Menschen, rühmet Gottes Liebe, BWV 167, was performed. As Bach had arrived in Leipzig just a month before, it seems hardly possible that he had been involved in developing the new instrument, even if one were to question the identity of the Waldhautbois a year earlier. But Bach was certainly the most prolific and most important composer for oboe da caccia, often using them in pairs. In 1723 alone, Bach wrote four cantatas using this instrument, the others being Schauet doch und sehet, ob irgend ein Schmerz sei, BWV 46, 1 August, Siehe zu, daß deine Gottesfurcht nicht Heuchelei sei, BWV 179, 8 August), and Ich elender Mensch, wer wird mich erlösen, BWV 48, 3 October. Bach wrote extensively for the oboe da caccia in the years 1723–27. There are also significant parts for the oboe da caccia in his Christmas Oratorio (BWV 248, 1734), the Passions (St John Passion, 1724, and St Matthew Passion, c. 1727), and the cantatas.

Other known compositions for the oboe da caccia are by Fasch. The oboe da caccia was used only in the late Baroque period, after which it fell out of use until interest in authentic performance in the 20th century caused it to be revived. During the period c. 1780–1820, roughly the Classical period, centering on Vienna, the soprano oboe underwent major changes first in bore and then in keywork. It is therefore understandable that the oboe da caccia, with its complex means of construction, was not selected for the same evolutionary "treatment". The early English horn (corno inglese, cor anglais) was no doubt more suitable.  Innovation was the watchword of the day, and antiquated instruments such as the oboe da caccia stood little chance of surviving (cf. the way in which the piano supplanted the harpsichord). A curious note: according to Cecil Forsyth in his famous book on orchestration, Beethoven was the last composer to write a part for the oboe da caccia until modern times. However, Forsyth wrote during a period when organology (the study of musical instruments) was in its infancy. Many of his statements, including the one about Beethoven, are in need of revision in light of modern research—in this case, Beethoven—in his Trios for two oboes and a deeper instrument in F —clearly labeled this deeper part "corno inglese" (English horn).

Construction

The oboe da caccia has a leather-covered wooden body terminating in a large wooden bell, or in the case of Eichentopf's instruments, a flaring brass bell as pictured above. There are typically two brass keys, E-flat and C. The E-flat key is normally doubled for the left hand. There are usually two twin fingerholes, G/A-flat and F/F#, similar to the soprano baroque oboe. The construction differs from that of practically all other woodwinds. The bore and outward profiles are first created on the lathe, then a series of saw kerfs are made through the bore from the side, which is to become the inner curve. Then the instrument is bent over steam and a slat glued onto the inside curve to fix it. Any remaining lacunae in the kerfs are filled and the curved section is covered with leather. The da caccia is played with a double reed; the sound is very mellow and supple.

The oboe da caccia stands in a rather unusual relationship to the rest of the oboe family. It cannot rightly be called the precursor of the English horn (the predominant name in North America and German-speaking countries) or cor anglais (the name used in England and France), as it largely developed at the same time as the English horn. The evolution of the English horn is more complex and less straightforward. The da caccia sounds like none of the other members of the oboe family, and no other instrument may legitimately substitute for it—although the English horn is routinely used for this purpose.

The oboe da caccia after Bach and modern reconstruction

After Bach, the oboe da caccia quickly fell out of use. The knowledge of its exact sound and construction was lost, and instruments once believed to be oboes da caccia have proven not to be this instrument at all or to consist only of parts of one. The consensus amongst scholars during the first half of the 20th century was that no known instruments from Bach's time had survived to the present day. Curt Sachs, in his Real-Lexicon der Musikinstrumente (1913), for example, included a crude and rather speculative drawing of an oboe da caccia.  Interest in the da caccia was revived in the early 1970s, in part due to the ongoing Telefunken Records project to record the complete cantatas of J.S. Bach, conducted by Nikolaus Harnoncourt and Gustav Leonhardt. The taille, a straight two-key oboe pitched in F, had previously been used for the da caccia parts in period-instrument recordings, with mixed results.

It fell to Cary Karp, a curator at the Music Museum in Stockholm, Sweden, to make the discovery that in fact two well-preserved (but unplayable) Eichentopf da caccias existed in museums in Scandinavia: one of them in his own museum, and another in a museum in Copenhagen.  The results of his research were published in the Galpin Society Journal article. Using measurements taken from the two instruments, oboist and instrument maker Paul Hailperin of Zell im Wiesental, Germany, made the first modern-day copies, and these were used in the Harnoncourt recording of the Weihnachtsoratorium that appeared in late 1973.

Modern-day makers of oboes da caccia include Sand Dalton of Lopez Island, Washington, United States; Richard Earle and Tony Millyard in the UK; Marcel Ponseele in France; Henri Gohin in France; and Joel Robinson in New York City.

References

Single oboes with conical bore
Baroque instruments